Coronel Felipe Varela International Airport  is an airport in Catamarca Province, Argentina serving the city of San Fernando del Valle de Catamarca. It was built in 1972, and was officially inaugurated with an Aerolíneas Argentinas Boeing 737 flight on 3 January 1973. Construction of the terminal started on 9 June 1981 and ended on 23 April 1987. Since 1999, the airport has been operated by Aeropuertos Argentina 2000. In 2007, it handled 44,477 passengers.

The airport is named after Felipe Varela, a soldier born in Catamarca in 1821 who fought in the Paraguayan War and died in Ñantoco, Chile in 1870.

Airlines and destinations

Statistics

References

External links
  Aeropuerto de Catamarca "Coronel Felipe Vallese" at Organismo Regulador del Sistema Nacional de Aeropuertos
  Aeropuertos Argentina 2000
 American Jet s.a. (English or Spanish)
 
 

Airports in Catamarca Province